Mamoudou Touré (2 April 1928 – 28 December 2017) was a Senegalese economist, diplomat and politician. He served as Minister of Economy and Finance from May 1983 until April 1988 under former President Abdou Diouf. Under Touré, the government launched a series of agricultural and industrial policies.

Touré was also a former official and economist for the International Monetary Fund (IMF), which he joined in April 1967. He chaired the board of directors of the Senegalese-Tunisian Bank (Banque sénégalo-tunisienne) later in life.

Mamoudou Touré died in Dakar, Senegal, on 28 December 2017, at the age of 89.

References

1928 births
2017 deaths
Senegalese economists
Finance ministers of Senegal
Senegalese diplomats
People from Gorgol Region